Acanthogonatus parana is a mygalomorph spider of Argentina, its name referring to its type locality: Paraná, Entre Ríos. Females are most similar to those of A. centralis, but are distinguished by the narrow fundus of the spermathecae.

Description
Female: total length ; cephalothorax length , width ; cephalic region length , width ; fovea width ; medial ocular quadrangle length , width ; labium length , width; sternum length , width . Its cephalic region is modestly convex, and it has a procurved fovea. Its labium possesses no cuspules. A serrula is present. Its sternal sigilla is as in A. Centralis, and it has a lightly reborder sternum. Chelicerae: rastellum is formed by long and attenuate setae. Its cephalothorax, legs and palpi are a yellowish brown colour, while its abdomen is densely mottled and ventrally pallid, with some dark spots in front of spinnerets.

Distribution
This species can be found in silk tubes under boulders of calcium carbonate, at the foot of the Río Paraná. It is only known from this location, in eastern Entre Ríos Province, Argentina.

References

Further reading
Study on a Mygalomorph spider community in central Argentina:

External links

 ADW entry

ZipcodeZoo entry

Pycnothelidae
Spiders of Argentina
Spiders described in 1995